This Time is the debut studio album by R&B singer Taral Hicks. It is noted for its feature of various collaborations from the likes of Teddy Riley, Narada Michael Walden and future superstars that were then-unknown at the time; including Missy Elliott, DJ Eddie F and Chad Hugo of The Neptunes. The album also featured background vocals by Hicks' siblings; Tina Hicks, Miriam Hicks and Erik Hicks, who co-wrote two of the album's tracks: "A Lil' Somethin'" and "Whoopty Whoop".

Singles
Three singles were released from the album. The first was the love ballad "Ooh, Ooh Baby" featuring Missy "Misdemeanor" Elliott, which was released on June 18, 1996, and peaked at No. 81 on the Billboard Hot R&B Singles chart.

The second and third singles ("Distant Lover" and "Silly") were released a year later and peaked at Nos. 60 and 54, respectively, on the same chart. "Silly" also reached No. 4 on the Billboard Bubbling Under Hot 100 Singles chart.

Track listing

References

External links
Taral - This Time on Discogs

1997 debut albums
Albums produced by Chad Hugo
Albums produced by Eddie F
Albums produced by Teddy Riley
Motown albums
Taral Hicks albums